6pack is a Finnish television series. It was aired in 2008.

See also
List of Finnish television series

References

External links
 

Finnish television shows
2008 Finnish television series debuts
2008 Finnish television series endings
2000s Finnish television series
Yle original programming